Marie Curie (1867–1934) was a Franco-Polish chemist and physicist.

Marie Curie may also refer to:
Marie Curie (charity), a British terminal illness charity
Marie Curie (rover), a flight spare for the Sojourner Mars rover
Marie Curie (1977 miniseries), a 1977 UK TV miniseries starring Jane Lapotaire
Marie Curie (film), a 2016 Polish film
Maria Curie-Skłodowska University, a university in Lublin, Poland
Marie Curie High School, a public high school in Ho Chi Minh City, Vietnam
Marie Curie Middle School 158, a middle school in Bayside, New York
École élémentaire Marie-Curie, a public elementary school in London, Ontario, Canada
Maria Skłodowska-Curie Bridge, Warsaw, a bridge over the Vistula River in Warsaw, Poland

See also
Curie (disambiguation)
Madame Curie (disambiguation)
Marie Currie, rock singer and songwriter
Marie Skłodowska-Curie Actions, a research fellowship program run by the European Commission
Marie Curie Gargoyle, a sculpture based on Marie Curie
Marie Curie Medal, a science award